Jan Karcz (16 October 1892, in Modlica near Kraków – 25 January 1943, in Auschwitz) was a Polish Army Colonel, posthumously promoted to the rank of a Brigadier General.

During the Second World War he was held and murdered in the Birkenau concentration camp, of Nazi Germany.

Awards
 Virtuti Militari, Silver Medal
 Cross of Valour, four times
 Polonia Restituta, Officer Cross
 Cross of Merit, Golden Cross
 Order of the Star of Romania, Officer Cross
 Latvian Commemorative Medal

References

1892 births
1943 deaths
Military personnel who died in Nazi concentration camps
Polish generals
Polish resistance members of World War II
Home Army members
Officers of the Order of the Star of Romania
Recipients of the Silver Cross of the Virtuti Militari
Recipients of the Cross of Valour (Poland)
Officers of the Order of Polonia Restituta
Recipients of the Gold Cross of Merit (Poland)
Polish people who died in Auschwitz concentration camp
Military personnel from Kraków
Resistance members killed by Nazi Germany
Resistance members who died in Nazi concentration camps